Xerocrassa subrogata is a species of air-breathing land snail, a pulmonate gastropod mollusk in the family Geomitridae.

Distribution

This species is endemic to Spain, where it is widely distributed in the eastern provinces of the country.

References

 Bank, R. A.; Neubert, E. (2017). Checklist of the land and freshwater Gastropoda of Europe. Last update: July 16th, 2017

External links
 Pfeiffer, L. (1853). Diagnosen neuer Heliceen. Zeitschrift für Malakozoologie. Cassel (Theodor Fischer). 10 (4): 51-58

seetzeni
Molluscs of Europe
Endemic fauna of Spain
Gastropods described in 1853